François Jean Julien Lowyck (born 1 September 1894 in Bruges - 10 March 1969 in Bruges) was a Belgian football  player. His position on the field was forward.

Throughout his career, Lowyck only played for one team: Cercle Brugge. He made his debut in the 1912-13 season. That same season, Cercle Brugge lost the cup final. Only one season later, Lowyck would already become top scorer of the team. He would repeat this event in 1921, after the interruption due to World War I.

Frans Lowyck quit playing football the season before Cercle Brugge's second national championship and cup final victory.

External links
Frans Lowyck at Cerclemuseum.be 

1894 births
1969 deaths
Belgian footballers
Association football forwards
Cercle Brugge K.S.V. players
Belgian Pro League players
Footballers from Bruges